Dantouma "Yaya" Toure (born June 12, 2004) is a soccer player who plays as a winger for Colorado Rapids in Major League Soccer. Born in Guinea, he has represented the United States at youth level.

A resident of Trenton, New Jersey, Toure played prep soccer at Trenton Central High School.

Club career

Youth
Toure played as a member of the Players Development Academy (PDA) before moving to New York Red Bulls.

During the 2020 USL Championship season Toure appeared for New York Red Bulls II. He made his debut as a 77th-minute substitute during a 1–0 loss to Hartford Athletic on July 17, 2020.

Colorado Rapids
On March 4, 2021, Toure joined Major League Soccer club Colorado Rapids, with the Rapids acquiring his homegrown rights from the New York Red Bulls via a trade.

Colorado Springs Switchbacks (loan)
On May 13, 2021, Toure joined USL Championship side Colorado Springs Switchbacks FC on loan.

International career
Toure is eligible for both Guinea and the United States, and has represented the United States at under-16 and under-17 level.

References

External links 
 
 ussoccerda.com profile

2004 births
Living people
Trenton Central High School alumni
American soccer players
New York Red Bulls II players
Colorado Rapids players
Colorado Springs Switchbacks FC players
Association football midfielders
Soccer players from Trenton, New Jersey
USL Championship players
United States men's youth international soccer players
Guinean footballers
Guinean emigrants to the United States
American people of Guinean descent
Sportspeople of Guinean descent
Homegrown Players (MLS)
Major League Soccer players
Colorado Rapids 2 players
MLS Next Pro players